Petrus is a Latin name derived from the Greek meaning "rock", and is the common English prefix "petro-" used to describe rock-based substances, like petros-oleum or "rock oil." As the source of Peter, it is a common name for people from antiquity through the medieval era. In the Netherlands, Belgium and South Africa it remained a very common given name, though in daily life, many use less formal forms like Peter, Pierre, Piet and Pieter.

People with the name
 Petrus, Saint Peter, a Christian apostle and a founder of the Church
 Petrus (archbishop of Uppsala), third archbishop of Uppsala, Sweden, between 1187-1197

Latinized medieval and Renaissance name
Petrus Abailardus, Latin name for Peter Abelard (1079–1142)
Petrus de Abano (Pietro d'Abano; 1257–1315), Italian philosopher and doctor
Petrus Alphonsi (fl. 1106–1110), Spanish Jewish writer
Petrus Augustus (545–602), Byzantine curopalates
Petrus Aureolus (1280–1322), French theologian
Petrus Baldus de Ubaldis (1327–1400), Italian jurist
Petrus Bernardinus (1475–1502), Florentine sectarian 
Petrus Bertius (Pieter de Bert; 1565–1629), Flemish theologian, historian, geographer and cartographer
Petrus Bonus (Pietro Boni; fl. 1330s), Italian alchemist
Petrus Canisius (Pieter Kanis; 1521–1597), Dutch Jesuit Catholic theologian
Petrus Capuanus (fl. 1197–1214), Italian scholastic
Petrus Christus (ca. 1410/1420 – ca. 1475/76), Dutch painter
Petrus Comestor (Pierre le Mangeur; died c.1178), French theological writer and university administrator
Petrus de Cruce (fl. 1290–1302), Italian cleric, composer, and author
Petrus Cunaeus (Peter van der Kun; 1586–1638), Dutch philosopher
Petrus de Dacia (1230s–1289), Swedish monk, first author in Sweden
Petrus Dasypodius (Peter Hasenfratz, ca. 1495–1559), Swiss humanist
Petrus Dathenus (Pieter Datheen; c.1531–1588), Dutch Calvinist theologian
Petrus Diaconus (Pietro Diacono; c.1110–c.1159), Italian librarian of Montecassino 
Petrus Divaeus (Pieter van Dieven;1535–1581), Flemish historian
Petrus Dorlandus (Peter van Diest; 1451–1507), Flemish writer of the play Elckerlijc (translated into Everyman)
Petrus Forestus (Pieter van Foreest; 1521–1597), Dutch physician
Petrus de Natalibus (fl. 1400), Venetian hagiographer 
Petrus Peregrinus or Peter de Maricourt (fl. 1269), French writer on magnetism and astrolabes
Petrus Plancius (Pieter Platevoet; 1552–1622), Netherlandish astronomer, cartographer and clergyman
Petrus Ramus (1515–1572), French humanist, logician, and educational reformer

Modern given name
Petrus van der Aa (1530–1594), Brabantian jurist
Petrus Beukers (1899–1981), Dutch Olympic sailor
Petrus Johannes Blok (1855–1929), Dutch historian
Petrus Bosman (1928–2008), South African ballet dancer, teacher, and choreographer
Petrus Boumal (born 1993), Cameroonian footballer
Petrus Breitenbach (born 1987), South African lawn bowler
Petrus Camper (1722–1789), Dutch polymath
Petrus Codde (1648–1710), Dutch Old Catholic Archbishop of Utrecht 
Pierre Cuypers (1827–1921), Dutch architect
Petrus Josephus Wilhelmus Debije (1884–1966), Dutch-American physicist, Nobel laureate in Chemistry
Petrus Augustus de Génestet (1829–1861), Dutch poet and theologian
Petrus Ferdinandus Johannes van Hooijdonk (born 1969), Dutch footballer
Petrus de Jong (1915–2016), Dutch Prime Minister
Petrus Jacobus Joubert (1834–1900), Commandant-General of the South African Republic
Piet Keizer (1943–2017), Dutch footballer
Petrus Adrianus Kerstens (1896–1958), Dutch minister of Economic Affairs
Petrus Canisius van Lierde (1907–1995), Dutch/Belgian Vicar General for the Vatican City State
Petrus Andreas van Meeuwen (1772–1848), Dutch politician and lawyer
Petrus Palmu (born 1997), Finnish ice hockey player
Petrus Albertus van der Parra (1714–1775), Governor-General of the Dutch East Indies
Petrus Johannes Schotel (1808–1865), Dutch marine painter
Petrus Joseph Triest (1760–1836), Flemish Catholic priest, founder of the Sisters and Brothers of Charity
Petrus Antonius Verheyen (born 1931), Dutch economist
Petrus Vuyst (1691–1732), Governor of Dutch Bengal and Dutch Ceylon
Petrus Johannes Waardenburg (1886–1979), Dutch ophthalmologist and geneticist
Petrus Cornelis Constant Wiegman (1885–1963), Dutch artist
Petrus Josephus Zoetmulder (1906–1995), Dutch expert in the Old Javanese language

See also
 Henricus Petrus (1508–1579), Swiss printer
 Petri (given name)
 Petrus (disambiguation)
 Petrus (surname)

References

Latin masculine given names
Dutch masculine given names